Park Jung-Soo  (born 13 January 1987) is a South Korean footballer who plays for Gwangju FC as a midfielder.

Park started his senior career at Daejeon KHNP of Korea National League in 2009, where he stayed until December 2009.

In 2010, he joined Japanese club Sagan Tosu, and made his Sagan Tosu debut on 12 September 2010 against Ventforet Kofu.

After the 2010-11 season he moved to Busan Transportation Corporation FC.

He then transferred to the Chinese club Fujian Smart Hero in March 2012 and subsequently played for a number of other clubs before joining Gwangju FC in 2019.

References

External links 

1987 births
Living people
Association football midfielders
South Korean footballers
South Korean expatriate footballers
Sagan Tosu players
Goyang Zaicro FC players
Gwangju FC players
K League 2 players
K League 1 players
Korea National League players
J2 League players
Expatriate footballers in Japan
South Korean expatriate sportspeople in Japan
Expatriate footballers in China
South Korean expatriate sportspeople in China
Expatriate footballers in Thailand
Park Jung-soo
South Korean expatriate sportspeople in Thailand
Park Jung-soo
Cangzhou Mighty Lions F.C. players
China League One players
Pocheon Citizen FC players